Ryōtarō, Ryotaro, Ryoutarou or Ryohtaroh is a masculine Japanese given name. Notable people with the name include:

Ryotaro Azuma (1893–1983), Japanese physician and bureaucrat, Governor of Tokyo 1959 to 1967
, Japanese footballer
, Japanese footballer
, Japanese footballer
Ryōtarō Okiayu (born 1969), Japanese voice actor
Ryōtarō Shiba (1923–1996), Japanese author
, Japanese actor and impressionist
Ryōtarō Sugi (born 1944), Japanese singer and actor
Ryotaro Tanose (born 1943), Japanese politician of the Liberal Democratic Party
, Japanese footballer

Fictional characters
Ryotaro Nogami, a character from Kamen Rider Den-O
Ryotaro Dojima (堂島 良太郎), a character in Persona 4

See also
Ryūtarō

Japanese masculine given names